Somaliland–Taiwan relations refers to the relationship between the Republic of Somaliland and the Republic of China (Taiwan). The two countries have no formal diplomatic relations, but they have established embassy-like representative offices in each other's capital. Taiwan's Ministry of Foreign Affairs refers to Somaliland as a country as of 2023, implying official recognition. Taiwan is currently the only country in the world to recognize Somaliland in this capacity.

History

The Republic of China (Taiwan) and the Republic of Somaliland have gradually established good interactive relations since 2009. Both countries are members of UNPO.

In November 2019, Ali Yang Syin-yi, Director-General of the Department of West Asian and African Affairs of the Department of the Ministry of Foreign Affairs of the Republic of China, went to Somaliland to meet with the head of the Central Bank. The head hoped to establish a close partnership with the Central Bank of the Republic of China.

In February 2020, the Foundation for International Cooperation and Development (CCICED) went to Somaliland to negotiate closer cooperation on agriculture, health and technological development. The Vice President of Somaliland hosted a banquet at his residence, the Minister of Agriculture, the Deputy Minister of Foreign Affairs and other officials.

On 30 July 2020, the former President of the Republic of China Lee Teng-hui died. The Ministry of Foreign Affairs of Somaliland stated on Twitter that "the former President Lee Teng-hui has passed away. For such a huge loss, the Ministry of Foreign Affairs of Somaliland, on behalf of the government and people, offers to the government and people of Taiwan. My sincere condolences, we are with Taiwan."

On 3 August 2020, the "Somaliland Chronicle" reported that Somaliland President Muse Bihi Abdi instructed to discuss specific measures to strengthen bilateral relations with Taiwan, and carefully studied the US "Taipei Act", and made relevant suggestions. 

On 3 March 2021, Somaliland and Taiwan signed an information technology cooperation agreement meant to upgrade the digitization of Somaliland's government. The three-year plan involved training staff and upgrading Internet management.

Representative organization

On 26 February 2020, the Government of the Republic of China and the Government of Somaliland signed the "Bilateral Protocol between the Government of the Republic of China (Taiwan) and the Government of the Republic of Somaliland" in Taipei after consultations between the Republic of China's Foreign Minister Joseph Wu Jaushieh and the Somaliland's Foreign Minister Mu Yassin. The two countries have agreed to establish mutual official representative offices under the names of Taiwan Representative Office and Somaliland Representative Office, and the treatment shall be similar to the Vienna Convention on Diplomatic Relations, which deals with the privileges and immunities of diplomats. After the signing ceremony, Mu Yassin will also meet with President Tsai Ing-wen. On 1 July, Joseph Wu officially announced that the unveiling date will be further negotiated by the two countries; Somaliland President Bihi shared Tsai Ing-wen's tweets on Twitter and expressed his gratitude to Tsai Ing-wen during his visit to Taiwan. Reception, the relationship between the two countries is built on shared value and mutual respect.

On 3 July 2020, the Ministry of Foreign Affairs of the Republic of China announced that Allen Lou Chenhwa, Counselor of the Taipei Economic and Cultural Representative Office in the Kingdom of Saudi Arabia, will serve as the first representative in Somaliland; Mud served as the first representative in Taiwan, arrived in Taiwan on 7 August.

On 17 August 2020, the Taiwan Representative Office in the Republic of Somaliland (Taiwan Representative Office in the Republic of Somaliland) was established in Hargeisa, the capital, hosted by the first representative Allen Lou and Somaliland Foreign Minister Mu Yassin. At the unveiling ceremony, the national flag of the Republic of China was raised in front of the representative office. The foreign ministers of the two countries signed the Agreement on Technical Cooperation between the Government of the Republic of China (Taiwan) and the Government of the Republic of Somaliland.

See also

Taiwan Representative Office in the Republic of Somaliland
Foreign relations of Somaliland
Foreign relations of Taiwan
China–Somalia relations

References

 
Taiwan
Bilateral relations of Taiwan